Těšovice is a name of several locations in the Czech Republic:

 Těšovice (Prachatice District), a village in South Bohemian Region (Prachatice District)
 Těšovice (Sokolov District), a village in Karlovy Vary Region (Sokolov District)